Cytochrome P450, family 3, subfamily A, also known as CYP3A, is a human gene locus. A homologous locus is found in mice.

The CYP3A locus includes all the known members of the 3A subfamily of the cytochrome P450 superfamily of genes. These genes encode monooxygenases which catalyze many reactions involved in drug metabolism and synthesis of cholesterol, steroids and other lipids. The CYP3A cluster consists of four genes:
 CYP3A4,
 CYP3A5, 
 CYP3A7, and 
 CYP3A43. 
The region also contains four pseudogenes:
 , 
 ,
 , and 
 .
as well as several extra exons which may or may not be included in transcripts produced from this region. Previously another CYP3A member, CYP3A3, was thought to exist; however, it is now thought that this sequence represents a transcript variant of CYP3A4.

References

Further reading 

 
 
 
 
 
 
 
 
 
 
 
 
 
 
 
 
 

3
EC 1.14.14